Dangers is an American hardcore punk band from Los Angeles, California, formed in 2005. They have released three EPs and three studio albums, most recently The Bend in the Break which came out in 2016 on Topshelf Records.

History
Dangers formed in 2005, releasing a self-titled EP the same year. The following year, they released their debut full-length album Anger on Dangers Records. In 2010, they released their second album Messy, Isn't It? on Vitriol Records. In 2011, they appeared at Fluff Fest in the Czech Republic for the first time, returning in 2013 and 2015. In 2014, Dangers released their second EP Five O'Clock Shadows at the Edge of the Western World on Secret Voice. In 2016, they released their third album The Bend in the Break on Topshelf Records.

Members
Alfred Brown IV – vocals, spoken word
Jack Shirley – lead guitar
Justin Smith –  rhythm guitar
Chris Conde – bass
Anthony Rivera – drums

Former Members
Justin Smith – guitar
Earl Carrasco - bass
Tim Culver – bass
James Phillips – drums
Alex McLeod – drums
Curt Baer – guitar
Adam Castle – drums
Beezo - guitar
Rollie Ulug - guitar and drums

Discography
Studio albums
Anger (2006, Dangers Records)
Messy, Isn't It? (2010, Vitriol Records)
The Bend in the Break (2016, Topshelf Records)

Demos, EPs, and Singles
Demo (2005, Self-released)
Dangers (2005, Old Guard Records)
Five O'Clock Shadows at the Edge of the Western World (2014, Secret Voice)
Kiss With Spit 7" (2016, Vitriol Records)

References

Musical groups from Los Angeles
Hardcore punk groups from California
Punk rock groups from California
2005 establishments in California
Musical groups established in 2005
Topshelf Records artists
Musical quartets